William G. Zinkil (April 14, 1919 – 2011) was an American politician. He served as a Democratic member for the 85th district of the Florida House of Representatives. He also served as a member for the 32nd district of the Florida Senate.

Life and career 
Zinkil was born in Chicago, Illinois. He moved to Hollywood, Florida in 1925.

In 1970, Zinkil was elected to represent the 85th district of the Florida House of Representatives, succeeding Richard A. Bird. He served until 1972, when he was succeeded by Arthur Rude. In the same year, he was elected to represent the 32nd district of the Florida Senate, serving until 1978.

Zinkil died in 2011.

References 

1919 births
2011 deaths
Politicians from Chicago
Democratic Party members of the Florida House of Representatives
Democratic Party Florida state senators
20th-century American politicians